Arcene is a comune (municipality) in the Province of Bergamo in the Italian region of Lombardy, located about  northeast of Milan and about  southwest of Bergamo.

Arcene borders the following municipalities: Castel Rozzone, Ciserano, Lurano, Pognano, Pontirolo Nuovo, Treviglio, Verdello.

Demographic evolution

References

External links
 www.comune.arcene.bg.it

Articles which contain graphical timelines